The Hard Stuff is the solo debut album by American musician Wayne Kramer, best known as a guitarist with the 1960s group MC5. It was released on January 10, 1995 by Epitaph Records. The band Claw Hammer backs up Kramer on most songs, with featured guest appearances by members of Bad Religion, the Melvins, and Suicidal Tendencies.

Critical reception 

New York wrote that "...the Hard Stuff shows [Kramer] to be in full command of his jam-kicking facilities," while praising the album's "vital rawness". David Sprague and Ira Robbins wrote in Trouser Press that the album "careens from free-jazz-backed spoken word to bug-eyed metal in a manner every bit as fierce and feral as Kramer's golden age." Entertainment Weeklys Mike Flaherty was less favorable, describing the album as "a bombastic album dominated by tales of ’90s-style sociopolitical decay" and giving it a C+. The Washington Posts Mark Jenkins was also critical of the album, writing that on it, Kramer "is still tough and eclectic, but he fails to reconjure the sheer abandon of his former band's best work." Alan Crandall wrote in Perfect Sound Forever that the album "had something, that undefinable "oomph" that keeps you throwing on a particular album because you just really like it for no easily articulated reason."

Track listing 
All tracks composed by Wayne Kramer; except where indicated.
 "Crack in the Universe"
 "Junkie Romance" (Kramer, Mick Farren)
 "Bad Seed" (Kramer, Mick Farren)
 "Poison"
 "Realm of Pirate Kings" (Kramer, Mick Farren)
 "Incident on Stock Island"
 "Pillar of Fire" (Kramer, Mick Farren)
 "Hope for Sale" (Kramer, Mick Farren)
 "Edge of the Switchblade"
 "Sharkskin Suit"
 "So Long Hank" (hidden track)

Personnel 
Sweet Pea Atkinson –	vocals on "Pillar of Fire"
Chris Bagarozzi –	guitar
Randy Bradbury –	bass
Sally Browder –	engineer, mixing
Greg Cathcart –	assistant engineer
Dale Crover –	drums, percussion on "Poison"
Mark Deutrom –	bass on "Poison"
Bruce Duff –	bass
Mick Farren – guest artist
Matt Freeman –	bass
Josh Freese –	drums
Brett Gurewitz –	guitar, mixing, vocals
James Jamerson, Jr. –	bass on "Pillar of Fire"
King Buzzo –	vocals on "Poison"
Wayne Kramer –	bass, guitar, mixing, vocals
Steve Kravac –	assistant engineer
Bob Lee –	drums
Stephen Marcussen – mastering
Keith Morris –	vocals on "Edge of the Switchblade"
Mackie Osborne – art direction
Tony Rambo –	assistant engineer
Brett Reed –	drums on "Realm of Pirate Kings"
Kim Shattuck –	vocals
Jon Wahl –	guitar, harmonica
Rob Walther –	bass
Dan Winters –	photography

References 

1995 debut albums
Wayne Kramer (guitarist) albums
Albums produced by Wayne Kramer (guitarist)
Epitaph Records albums